Roaring Fork River is a tributary of the Colorado River, approximately  long, in west central Colorado in the United States. The river drains a populated and economically vital area of the Colorado Western Slope called the Roaring Fork Valley or Roaring Fork Watershed, which includes the resort city of Aspen and the resorts of Aspen/Snowmass.

It rises in the Sawatch Range in eastern Pitkin County, on the west side of Independence Pass on the continental divide. It flows northwest past Aspen, Woody Creek, and Snowmass. It receives the Fryingpan River at Basalt.  below Carbondale, it receives the Crystal River from the south. It joins the Colorado in Glenwood Springs. The entire area that drains into the Roaring Fork River is known as the Roaring Fork Watershed. The river flows through canyons along most of its route and is a popular destination for recreation whitewater rafting. The river supplies water through the Sawatch Range to the Twin Lakes Reservoir via the Twin Lakes Tunnel. Roaring Fork Conservancy is the watershed conservation organization for the Roaring Fork River and its tributaries.

The Roaring Fork is a swift, deep, powerful river with very clear water. It is navigable by small craft throughout most of its length to its confluence with the Colorado.

See also
List of rivers of Colorado
List of tributaries of the Colorado River

References

External links

Roaring Fork Watershed
Roaring Fork Conservancy
Lodge on the Roaring Fork
Roaring Fork Anglers

Rivers of Pitkin County, Colorado
Rivers of Eagle County, Colorado
Rivers of Garfield County, Colorado
Glenwood Springs, Colorado
Rivers of Colorado
Roaring Fork Valley
Tributaries of the Colorado River in Colorado